This article displays the rosters for the participating teams at the 2004 FIBA Africa Championship.



|}
| valign="top" |
 Head coach

 Assistant coach

Legend
(C) Team captain
nat field describes country
|}



DR Congo



|}
| valign="top" |
 Head coach

 Assistant coach

Legend
 (C) Team captain
 Club field describes current club
|}







|}
| valign="top" |
 Head coach

 Assistant coach

Legend
 (C) Team captain
 Club field describes current club
|}

References

External links
Official Site

FIBA Africa Under-20 Championship